Surya is the chief solar deity in Hinduism. It is also a common name given for people of South Asia.
 Suryavansha (The Sun Dynasty), is one of the most prominent dynasties in the history of Hinduism.

Notable people
 Surya Bahadur Thapa (born 1928), Prime Minister of Nepal five times, under three different kings
 Surya Bonaly (born 1973), French-American professional figure skater
 Suryavarman, was King of the Khmer Empire
 Surya Das (born 1950), American Buddhist lama
 Surya Rau Bahadur, was Maharajah of Pithapuram
 Suriya (born 1975), an Indian Tamil actor
 Surya was an alias of Indrajit Gupta
 Surya (Telugu actor), an Indian Telugu actor known for his villainous roles

Other
 Surya (2004 film), an Indian Bengali film
 Surya (2023 film), an Indian Marathi-language action drama film
 Surya (river), a river in Perm Krai, Russia
 Surya TV, a Malayalam-language Indian television channel
 Surya Siddhanta, a treatise of Indian astronomy
 Surya (missile), an intercontinental ballistic missile
 Suryaraopeta, a census town in East Godavari district, Andhra Pradesh
 Surya, a brand of clove cigarette (kretek) by Gudang Garam

See also
 Sariya (disambiguation)
 Soraya (disambiguation)
 Suryaa (disambiguation)
 Suryanarayana (disambiguation)